Alma Dufour (born 6 May 1990) is a French politician from La France Insoumise who has been has been Member of Parliament for Seine-Maritime's 4th constituency since 2022.

References 

1990 births
Living people
Members of Parliament for Seine-Maritime
People from Auch
Deputies of the 16th National Assembly of the French Fifth Republic
21st-century French women politicians
21st-century French politicians
Women members of the National Assembly (France)
La France Insoumise politicians

French environmentalists
French women environmentalists
Pantheon-Sorbonne University alumni